This is a list of highways in San Antonio in the U.S. state of Texas, consisting of Interstates, U.S. highways, state highways, state highway loops and spurs maintained by the Texas Department of Transportation (TxDOT) in the San Antonio metropolitan area, consisting of Bexar County and its seven surrounding counties.  They range from multi-lane freeways that provide high-volume corridors to 2-lane roads.  In addition to the four Interstates, which must be freeways per the Interstate Highway standards,  US 90, US 281, SH 151, and the northern part of Loop 1604 are also freeways in San Antonio.  There are also a couple instances where other highways run concurrently with the aforementioned freeways; US 87 and SH 16 run concurrently with I-10 and I-410 respectively.

San Antonio's freeway system is built in resemblance of a hub and spoke system, with Downtown San Antonio at the center. I-10, I-35, and I-37 combine to form a nine-mile Central Loop around Downtown. I-410 and Loop 1604 are the other two urban loops around the city. Connecting all three loops are the city's radial freeways—for example, I-10 West (towards El Paso) serves the northwest side of the city.

Interstates

U.S. highways

State highways

State highway loops and spurs

Former

Gallery

See also

List of state highways in Texas

Notes

References

San Antonio

Highways